The Commission on International and Trans-Regional Accreditation (CITA) was an international educational accreditation agency.

CITA was formed in 1994 by regional accrediting organizations in the United States following a long history of collaboration under other auspices. CITA provided systems of accreditation around the world and it provided accreditation for individual schools. In 2008, CITA was acquired by AdvancED, which continues its work.

References

External links 
 AdvancED

School accreditors
Organizations established in 1994
Organizations disestablished in 2008